Bad Apples is a 2018 American horror film written and directed by Bryan Coyne. It stars Brea Grant, Graham Skipper, Aly Fitzgerald, Heather Vaughn and Richard Riehle. It runs for 85 minutes.

The film was released on February 6, 2018 and it received negative reviews from critics.

Synopsis
On Halloween night, two malevolent children terrorize a young and innocent couple in their home, subjecting them to an evening they will never forget.

Cast
 Brea Grant as Ella
 Graham Skipper as Robert
 Aly Fitzgerald as Sister #1 (as Alycia Lourim)
 Heather Vaughn as Sister #2
 Richard Riehle as Principal Dale
 Diane Ayala Goldner as Mrs. Dekker
 Miles Dougal as Samuel
 Heather Dorff as Pregnant Woman
 Sandy Stoltz as Man
 Kire Horton as Receptionist
 Sarah Parish as Nurse
 Bryan Coyne as Kenny
 Danielle Coyne as Kat (as Danielle Reverman)
 Hannah Prichard as Sandy
 Andrea Collins as Mandy
 Jasmin St. Claire as Trailer Park Murder Victim

Reception
On Culture Crypt the film has a review score of 20 out of 100 indicating "unfavorable reviews".

Felix Vasquez Jr. of Cinema Craze wrote:

References

External links
 

2018 horror films
2010s slasher films
American films about Halloween
Halloween horror films
American slasher films
American serial killer films
2010s English-language films
2010s American films